Rosane Kirch (born April 19, 1976 in Bacabal, Maranhão) is a female professional road cyclist from Brazil.

Career

2003
6th in Pan American Games, Road, Individual Time Trial, Santo Domingo (DOM)
2004
62nd in UCI Road World Championships, Verona, Italy (ITA)
2005
4th in Copa America de Ciclismo (BRA)
2006
2nd in Copa America de Ciclismo (BRA)
2007
3rd in Copa America de Ciclismo (BRA)
2008
10th in Copa America de Ciclismo (BRA)
2nd in GP Varazze Citta Delle Donne (ITA)
2nd in Stage 3 Route de France Féminine, Les Settons (FRA)
2nd in General Classification Route de France Féminine (FRA)
2009
9th in Copa America de Ciclismo (BRA)

References
 

1976 births
Living people
Brazilian female cyclists
Brazilian road racing cyclists
Cyclists at the 2003 Pan American Games
Sportspeople from Maranhão
South American Games silver medalists for Brazil
South American Games medalists in cycling
Competitors at the 2010 South American Games
Pan American Games competitors for Brazil
21st-century Brazilian women
20th-century Brazilian women